Karol Drzewiecki and Sergio Martos Gornés were the defending champions but only Martos Gornés chose to defend his title, partnering Marco Bortolotti. Martos Gornés lost in the semifinals to Yuki Bhambri and Saketh Myneni.

Bhambri and Myneni won the title after defeating Marek Gengel and Lukáš Rosol 6–2, 6–2 in the final.

Seeds

Draw

References

External links
 Main draw

Rafa Nadal Open - Doubles